Peristernia nassatula is a species of sea snail, a marine gastropod mollusk in the family Fasciolariidae, the spindle snails, the tulip snails and their allies.

Distribution
This marine species occurs off the Philippines and off Papua New Guinea

References

 Dautzenberg P. (1929). Contribution à l'étude de la faune de Madagascar: Mollusca marina testacea. Faune des colonies françaises, 3(4): 321-636, pls 4-7. Société d'Editions géographiques, maritimes et coloniales, Paris. 
 Liu, J.Y. [Ruiyu] (ed.). (2008). Checklist of marine biota of China seas. China Science Press. 1267 pp.
 Marais J.P. & R.N. Kilburn (2010) Fasciolariidae. Pp. 106-137, in: Marais A.P. & Seccombe A.D. (eds), Identification guide to the seashells of South Africa. Volume 1. Groenkloof: Centre for Molluscan Studies. 376 pp.

External links
 Küster, H. C. & Kobelt, W. (1844-1876). Die geschwäntzen unbewehrten Purpurschnecken. Erste Hälfte: Turbinella und Fasciolaria. In Abbildungen nach der Natur mit Beschreibungen. Mollusca Gasteropoda: Purpuracea: Purpurschnecken; Dritte Abtheilung. Systematisches Conchylien-Cabinet von Martini und Chemnitz, ed.2

Gastropods described in 1822
Fasciolariidae